Stanford M. Adelstein (born August 19, 1931) is an American politician from the state of South Dakota. He is a member of the Republican Party. He served in the South Dakota House of Representatives from 2001 to 2005, and in the South Dakota Senate from 2005 to 2007 and again from 2008 to 2013.

Early life and education
Adelstein was born in Sioux City, Iowa. He grew up in Rapid City, South Dakota, but graduated from high school in Denver, Colorado, where there were more opportunities for him to connect with his Jewish heritage. He graduated from the University of Colorado Boulder, where he majored in civil engineering and business. He served in the United States Army, and then returned to Rapid City in 1957. His family founded the Northwestern Engineering Company, where he worked and eventually took over. He also earned a Graduate of Business Administration degree with honors from South Dakota of School Mines & Technology.

Political career
Adelstein was elected to the South Dakota House of Representatives in 2000, and served four years in the House before he was elected to the South Dakota Senate in 2005. In 2006, Adelstein was defeated in the Republican primary by Elli Schwiesow. He endorsed the Democratic Party nominee, Tom Katus. In 2008, Adelstein regained the seat, defeating Katus and Schwiesow in a three-way race with Schwiesow running as an independent. Adelstein ran unopposed for the South Dakota Senate in 2010 and 2012. In December 2013, Adelstein resigned from the South Dakota Senate due to health reasons.

Personal life
Adelstein is the father of three sons, including Jonathan Adelstein.

Adelstein offered to put up $1.2 million in an attempt to keep the fossils of Sue, the largest tyrannosaurus rex ever discovered, in South Dakota. Ultimately, he was out-bid at the Sotheby's auction in New York City. Adelstein was featured in the documentary film Dinosaur 13 for these efforts.

Publications 
In August 2019, a biography about Adelstein entitled "The Question is "Why?"" by Eric Steven Zimmer was published by Vantage Point Press.

References

External links
 Official page at the South Dakota Legislature
 Campaign site
 
 Biography at Ballotpedia
 Financial information (state office) at the National Institute for Money in State Politics

1931 births
Jewish American state legislators in South Dakota
Living people
Republican Party members of the South Dakota House of Representatives
Politicians from Rapid City, South Dakota
Politicians from Sioux City, Iowa
Republican Party South Dakota state senators
United States Army soldiers
University of Colorado Boulder alumni
Engineers from South Dakota
21st-century American Jews